Rolf Graf (19 August 1932 - 18 January 2019) was a Swiss professional road bicycle racer. Rolf Graf was a protégé of the Swiss cyclist Ferdinand Kübler.

He competed in the individual and team road race events at the 1952 Summer Olympics. He was the Swiss National Road Race champion in 1956. In 1963, Graf had car crash in Italy, from which he never really recovered, and in 1964 he had to stop his cycling career.

Major results

1954
Gent–Wevelgem
1955
Locarno
1956
 national road race championship
Tour de Suisse
Trofeo Baracchi (with André Darrigade)
1957
Basel
1958
GP du Locle
1959
 national road race championship
Giro d'Italia:
Winner stage 22
Tour de France:
Winner stages 12 and 19
1960
Nice
Tour de France:
Winner stage 19
Trofeo Longines (with Guido Carlesi, Silvano Ciampi, Emile Daems and Alfredo Sabbadin)
1962
 national road race championship
Berner Rundfahrt

References

External links 

Official Tour de France results for Rolf Graf

1932 births
2019 deaths
People from Aarau District
Swiss male cyclists
Swiss Tour de France stage winners
Cyclists at the 1952 Summer Olympics
Olympic cyclists of Switzerland
Swiss Giro d'Italia stage winners
Tour de Suisse stage winners
Sportspeople from Aargau
20th-century Swiss people
21st-century Swiss people